Oliver Langdon is an educator and former political figure in Newfoundland and Labrador. He represented Fortune Bay-Cape La Hune in the Newfoundland and Labrador House of Assembly from 1989 to 2007 as a Progressive Conservative and then Liberal member.

He was born in Seal Cove, Fortune Bay and educated at Memorial University. Langdon married Margaret Loveless. He served in the provincial cabinet as Minister of Environment and Labour and as Minister of Municipal and Provincial Affairs. Langdon was a member of the town council for Point Leamington.

First elected as a Progressive Conservative in 1989, Langdon ran as a Liberal in 1993, and beat Progressive Conservative candidate and future Premier of Newfoundland and Labrador, Kathy Dunderdale. He resigned from provincial politics in 2007; Langdon lost to Judy Foote when he sought the Liberal candidacy in the federal riding of Random–Burin–St. George's in August 2007.

References 
 

Year of birth missing (living people)
Living people
Progressive Conservative Party of Newfoundland and Labrador MHAs
Liberal Party of Newfoundland and Labrador MHAs
21st-century Canadian politicians